Opisthodontia may refer to:

Opisthodontia (moth), a genus of moths in the family Lasiocampidae
Opisthodontia (reptile), a clade of reptiles in the order Rhynchocephalia